Mary A. Gaskill (born December 1, 1941) is an American politician who was the Iowa State Representative from the 81st District. She served in the Iowa House of Representatives from 2003 to 2021.

Gaskill served on several committees in the Iowa House - the Environmental Protection committee; the State Government committee; the Transportation committee; and the Local Government committee, where she was chair.  She also served on the Administration and Regulation Appropriations Subcommittee.

Gaskill was re-elected in 2006 with 7,210 votes, running unopposed.

She lost her bid for re-election to Cherielynn Westrich in 2020.

Family
Mary is married to her husband Jim and together they have 4 children: Rex, Alicia, Kathy, and Brenda. Mary and her husband currently live in Ottumwa, Iowa.

Education
Gaskill attended Ravenwood High School where she received her diploma. She later attended Gard Business University.

Professional experience
Gaskill was a county auditor for the Wapello County
She was also a clerk to the county auditor for Wapello County

References

External links
 Representative Mary Gaskill official Iowa General Assembly site
Mary Gaskill State Representative official constituency site
 

Democratic Party members of the Iowa House of Representatives
Living people
Women state legislators in Iowa
1941 births
People from Nodaway County, Missouri
People from Ottumwa, Iowa
21st-century American politicians
21st-century American women politicians